A national monument in the Republic of Ireland is a structure or site, the preservation of which has been deemed to be of national importance and therefore worthy of state protection. If the land adjoining the monument is essential to protect it, this land may also be protected.

Equivalent monuments in Northern Ireland are termed scheduled monuments and come under the protection of the Department for Communities.

Legal framework for protection
National monuments are managed under the auspices of the National Monuments Service, which is part of the Department of Housing, Local Government and Heritage. The official status of national monument is conferred under the National Monuments Acts 1930 to 2014.

Monuments had been protected under the Ancient Monuments Protection Act 1882, an Act of the Parliament of the United Kingdom of Great Britain and Ireland. After the establishment of the Irish Free State in 1922, this framework was reformed by the National Monuments Act 1930. The list of national monuments has since been expanded. By 2010 there were nearly 1,000 monuments in state ownership or guardianship, although this represents only a small proportion of Ireland's recorded archaeological heritage. There are more than 126,000 known sites ['Recorded Monuments'] in Ireland. Each national monument is numbered (for example, the Rock of Cashel is National Monument number 128, Newgrange is number 147), and a numbered monument may represent a group of sites, as is the case at the Rock of Cashel.

A provision of the National Monuments (Amendment) Act 2004 allows for the destruction in whole or in part of a national monument by the Government of Ireland if such destruction is deemed to be in the "public interest". According to press reports, these provisions were included to facilitate road schemes, and in particular the destruction of Carrickmines Castle, a national monument, to build an intersection along the south-eastern section of the M50 motorway.

World Heritage Sites

Two national monuments are also recognised by UNESCO as World Heritage Sites:  in County Meath and Skellig Michael in County Kerry.

List of monuments 

The following is an index to lists of National Monuments of the Republic of Ireland, divided by province.

Connacht

 List of National Monuments in County Galway
 List of National Monuments in County Leitrim
 List of National Monuments in County Mayo
 List of National Monuments in County Roscommon
 List of National Monuments in County Sligo

Leinster

 List of National Monuments in County Carlow
 List of National Monuments in County Dublin
 List of National Monuments in County Kildare
 List of National Monuments in County Kilkenny
 List of National Monuments in County Laois
 List of National Monuments in County Longford
 List of National Monuments in County Louth
 List of National Monuments in County Meath
 List of National Monuments in County Offaly
 List of National Monuments in County Westmeath
 List of National Monuments in County Wexford
 List of National Monuments in County Wicklow

Munster

 List of National Monuments in County Clare
 List of National Monuments in County Cork
 List of National Monuments in County Kerry
 List of National Monuments in County Limerick
 List of National Monuments in County Tipperary
 List of National Monuments in County Waterford

Ulster

 List of National Monuments in County Cavan
 List of National Monuments in County Donegal
 List of National Monuments in County Monaghan

References

 
Archaeological sites in the Republic of Ireland
Monuments and memorials in the Republic of Ireland
Heritage registers in the Republic of Ireland
Department of Housing, Local Government and Heritage